The 2016–17 season is the 120th season of competitive football by Heart of Midlothian F.C. with the team participating in the Scottish Premiership.

The club begins its second consecutive season in the top tier of Scottish football, having been promoted from the Scottish Championship at the end of the 2014–15 season. Hearts played just one season in the Scottish Championship after relegation from the Scottish Premiership at the end of the 2013–14 season. Hearts also competed in the Scottish Cup, Scottish League Cup, and the UEFA Europa League.

Summary

Management
Hearts started the Season with Robbie Neilson at the helm having been promoted to Head Coach for the 2014–15 season. On 2 December 2016, Robbie Neilson joined English Football League One side MK Dons along with assistant manager Stevie Crawford. With 2 years remaining on his contract compensation was paid to Hearts. For that following weekend's fixture against Ross County, Jon Daly and Andy Kirk took charge, overseeing a 2–2 draw. On 5 December, Ian Cathro was named as Hearts' new manager. Although taking the position with no prior playing or management experience, Cathro was a coach at Rio Ave, Valencia and Newcastle United. He was joined by Northern Ireland assistant manager Austin MacPhee.

Results & fixtures

Premiership

Scottish Cup

League Cup

UEFA Europa League

Qualifying rounds

First team player statistics

Captains
{| class="wikitable" style="font-size: 95%; text-align: center;"
|-
! style="background:maroon; color:white;" scope="col" width=60|No
! style="background:maroon; color:white;" scope="col" width=60|Pos
! style="background:maroon; color:white;" scope="col" width=150|Name
! style="background:maroon; color:white;" scope="col" width=80|Country
! style="background:maroon; color:white;" scope="col" width=80|No of games
! style="background:maroon; color:white;" scope="col" width=80|Notes
|-
|5||DF||Öztürk||||5||Captain
|-
|6||MF||Kitchen||||25||Captain
|-
|7||MF||Walker||||1||Vice-captain
|-
|15|||MF||Cowie||||16||Vice-captain

Squad information
During the 2016–17 season, Hearts have used thirty-three players in competitive games. The table below includes all players registered with the SPFL as part of Hearts squad for 2016–17 season. They may not have made an appearance.
Last updated 23 May 2017
{| class="wikitable" style="font-size: 100%; text-align: center;"
|-
! style="background:maroon; color:white; width:30px;" rowspan="2" | Number
! style="background:maroon; color:white; width:10%;" rowspan="2" | Position
! style="background:maroon; color:white; width:10%;" rowspan="2" | Nation
! style="background:maroon; color:white; width:20%;" rowspan="2" | Name
! style="background:maroon; color:white;" colspan="2" | Totals
! style="background:maroon; color:white;" colspan="2" | Premiership
! style="background:maroon; color:white;" colspan="2" | Europa League
! style="background:maroon; color:white;" colspan="2" | League Cup
! style="background:maroon; color:white;" colspan="2" | Scottish Cup
|-
! style="background:maroon; color:white; width:60px;" |Apps
! style="background:maroon; color:white; width:60px;" |Goals
! style="background:maroon; color:white; width:60px;" |Apps
! style="background:maroon; color:white; width:60px;" |Goals
! style="background:maroon; color:white; width:60px;" |Apps
! style="background:maroon; color:white; width:60px;" |Goals
! style="background:maroon; color:white; width:60px;" |Apps
! style="background:maroon; color:white; width:60px;" |Goals
! style="background:maroon; color:white; width:60px;" |Apps
! style="background:maroon; color:white; width:60px;" |Goals
|-

|-
|colspan="14"|Players away from Heart of Midlothian on loan:

|-
|colspan="14"|Players who appeared for Heart of Midlothian no longer at the club:

Appearances (starts and substitute appearances) and goals include those in Scottish Premiership, Europa League, League Cup and the Scottish Cup.

Disciplinary Record
Last updated 23 May 2017

Goal Scorers
(Played in Italics have since left club)
Last updated 23 May 2017

Clean sheets
Last updated 23 May 2017
{| class="wikitable" style="font-size: 95%; text-align: center;"
|-
! style="background:maroon; color:white;" scope="col" width=60|
! style="background:maroon; color:white;" scope="col" width=60|
! style="background:maroon; color:white;" scope="col" width=60|
! style="background:maroon; color:white;" scope="col" width=150|Name
! style="background:maroon; color:white;" scope="col" width=80|Games
! style="background:maroon; color:white;" scope="col" width=80|Premiership
! style="background:maroon; color:white;" scope="col" width=80|Europa League
! style="background:maroon; color:white;" scope="col" width=80|League Cup
! style="background:maroon; color:white;" scope="col" width=80|Scottish Cup
! style="background:maroon; color:white;" scope="col" width=80|Total
|-
|1
|GK
|
|Jack Hamilton
|44
|10
|1
|0
|1
|12
|-
|2
|GK
|
|Viktor Noring
|3
|0
|0
|0
|0
|0
|-
|
|
|
! Totals !! 45 !! 10 !! 1 !! 0 !! 1!! 12

Team statistics

League table

Scottish Premiership results by round

Management statistics
Last updated on 23 May 2017

Club

Club staff
As of 23 May 2017

Boardroom

Transfers

In

Out

Loans in

Loans out

See also
List of Heart of Midlothian F.C. seasons

Notes

References

2016–17
Scottish football clubs 2016–17 season